was a Japanese painter of the Kanō school. He was also known as Kanō Masanobu (the name of his famous ancestor, the founder of the school) and Kanō Shōsen, and took the gō (art-names) Soshōsei and Shōko.

Shōsen'in studied in a studio in the Kobikichō section of Edo, under his father, Seisen also known as Kanō Osanobu.

References
Frédéric, Louis (2002). Japan Encyclopedia. Cambridge, Massachusetts: Harvard University Press.

1823 births
1880 deaths
Kanō school
19th-century Japanese people
19th-century Japanese artists
19th-century Japanese painters